Anatoly Vasilievich Oleynik, Professor of Chemistry at the University of Nizhni Novgorod.

Currently serving as the scientific supervisor for the photochemistry lab as well as the v-rector for the University for scientific research at University of Nizhni Novgorod, Russia.

Dr. Oleynik graduated from Gorky State University in 1959 with a Doctorate's degree, with a special focus on organic chemistry.

His doctoral dissertation was entitled "Physical and chemical properties of aromatic azides and the mechanism of photochemical transformations in photosensitive materials on their base".

His passion for photochemistry and polymer composition in photoresistive systems is a cornerstone of teaching at the Spectroscopy Department at the University of Nizhni.

Dr. Oleynik has 220 published papers and 25 Russian issued patents.

References

Russian chemists
Living people
Year of birth missing (living people)